Eslami ya Misr ("Be safe, O Egypt") was the national anthem of Egypt from 1923 to 1936. It was written by the Egyptian poet Mostafa Saadeq Al-Rafe'ie, and the music was composed by Safar Ali. It is adopted currently as the song of the Egyptian Police Academy.

Lyrics

See also 
 Egyptian National Anthem
 Rasamna Ala Al-Qalb Wajh Al-Watan

References 
 Former national anthem of Egypt at YouTube
 Current song of Egyptian Police Academy

Historical national anthems
Anthems of Egypt
National symbols of Egypt